Helena Valley Northeast is a census-designated place (CDP) in Lewis and Clark County, Montana, United States. The population was 2,995 at the 2010 census. It is part of the Helena Micropolitan Statistical Area.

Geography
Helena Valley Northeast is located in southern Lewis and Clark County at  (46.671590, -111.941337). It is bordered to the southwest by the city of Helena, the state capital. It is bordered to the south by the Helena Valley Southeast CDP, to the west by the Helena Valley West Central CDP, and to the northwest by the Helena Valley Northwest CDP, all unincorporated.

Lake Helena, an arm of Hauser Lake, is in the center of the CDP. Hauser Lake is an impoundment on the Missouri River, and Lake Helena connects to it via Prickly Pear Creek, all at the same elevation as Hauser Lake.

Demographics

As of the census of 2000, there were 2,122 people, 776 households, and 619 families residing in the CDP. The population density was 45.4 people per square mile (17.5/km2). There were 830 housing units at an average density of 17.7/sq mi (6.9/km2). The racial makeup of the CDP was 97.74% White, 0.09% African American, 1.23% Native American, 0.05% Asian, 0.19% from other races, and 0.71% from two or more races. Hispanic or Latino of any race were 0.90% of the population.

There were 776 households, out of which 37.0% had children under the age of 18 living with them, 69.8% were married couples living together, 5.5% had a female householder with no husband present, and 20.2% were non-families. 16.4% of all households were made up of individuals, and 3.4% had someone living alone who was 65 years of age or older. The average household size was 2.68 and the average family size was 3.00.

In the CDP, the population was spread out, with 26.0% under the age of 18, 5.5% from 18 to 24, 29.8% from 25 to 44, 28.9% from 45 to 64, and 9.8% who were 65 years of age or older. The median age was 39 years. For every 100 females, there were 106.0 males. For every 100 females age 18 and over, there were 104.0 males.

The median income for a household in the CDP was $50,804, and the median income for a family was $54,728. Males had a median income of $32,140 versus $26,563 for females. The per capita income for the CDP was $20,283. About 1.4% of families and 3.8% of the population were below the poverty line, including 3.6% of those under age 18 and 7.5% of those age 65 or over.

References

Census-designated places in Lewis and Clark County, Montana
Census-designated places in Montana
Helena, Montana micropolitan area